Pannarano is a comune (municipality) in the Province of Benevento in the Italian region Campania, located about  northeast of Naples and about  southwest of Benevento.

Pannarano borders the following municipalities: Avella, Pietrastornina, Roccabascerana, San Martino Valle Caudina, Sperone, Summonte, all of them located in the Province of Avellino.

Population evolution

References

External links

Cities and towns in Campania